Samuela Comola (born 30 April 1998 in Aosta) is an Italian biathlete. She competed at the  2022 Winter Olympics, in  Women's pursuit, and Women's sprint.

She competed at the 2017 IBU Youth World Championships and the 2021–22 Biathlon World Cup.

References 

Living people
1998 births
Italian female biathletes
Olympic biathletes of Italy
Biathletes at the 2022 Winter Olympics
Biathletes at the 2016 Winter Youth Olympics
Sportspeople from Aosta Valley
People from Aosta
Biathlon World Championships medalists